Yuri Vasilyevich Abramochkin (11 December 1936 – 5 April 2018) was a Soviet and Russian photographer and photojournalist.

Abramochkin started to work as a photojournalist at 21, in the office of "Mosstroy" (Main department of building and planning in Moscow) with the primary job of photographing plans. He got a chance to try himself in photography in 1957 when he was offered the position of official photographer of the World Festival of Youth and Students in Moscow. He also took photos of Komsomolskiy Prospekt for "Mosstroy" and those photos were published by Soviet Weekly, the Soviet newspaper for capitalist countries. Abramochkin worked for Soviet Weekly for forty years. In 1961 he started to work as a photographer of the news agency Novosti. Yuri Abramochkin is one of 15 Russian photojournalists included in the encyclopedia Contemporary Photographers, published by St. James Press in 1995.

Abramochkin worked with Soviet and world leaders, politicians and celebrities, making among others the photos of Nikita Khrushchev, Leonid Brezhnev, Mikhail Gorbachev, Boris Yeltsin, Charles de Gaulle, Willy Brandt, Francois Mitterrand, Richard Nixon, Urho Kekkonen, Jacques Chirac, Bill Clinton, Yuri Gagarin, Ronald Reagan, Valentina Tereshkova and Elizabeth II.

Gallery

Exhibitions

Solo exhibitions 
1970 — Photographs from the U.S.S.R., City Museum, Sopron, Hungary
1972 — Yugoslavia
1974 — U.S.S.R.: Country and People, Photo Artists' Salon, Belgrade
1976 — From the Photographer's Album, House of Culture, Prague
1976 — Photographs from the U.S.S.R., Exhibition Pavilion, West Berlin
1978 — Photographs from the U.S.S.R., Soviet Cultural Centre, Damascus
1978 — Sowjetunion: Land und Leute im Foto, Majakowski Galerie, West Berlin
1979 — From the Photographer's Album, Photo and Cine Club, Belgrade
1981 — India 
1981 — Romania 
1984 — Bulgaria
1988 — Yugoslavia 
2001 — Moscow
2002 — France
2009 — Yuri Abramochkin - Photoessay. Brothers Lumière Gallery. Moscow

Group exhibitions 
 1961: National Photo Exhibition, Manege Exhibition Hall, Moscow
 1962: International Photo-Agency Exhibition, Prague
 1964: WorldPress Photo, Amsterdam (and 1965–69, 1975–76, 1978)
 1966: Interpress Photo '66, Manege Exhibition Hall, Moscow
 1975: Fotosuit de Sovjet Unie, Stedelijk Museum, Amsterdam
 1976: Photographs from the U.S.S.R., Trade Fair Hall, West Berlin
 1979: Interpress Photo '79, Havana
 1980: Sportas Ambassador of Peace, Manege Exhibition Hall, Moscow

Books
Yuriy Abramochkin, Russia as I see her: Photoalbum 1960–2013. Moscow: Scanrus, 2013. . Text in English. (Here at Issuu.com.)

Awards 
 "Golden eye award". World Press Photo. 1987. For the picture of Mathias Rust
 Honored Cultural Worker of the RSFSR

References

External links 
Yuriy Abramochkin, as retrieved by the Wayback Machine on 2 May 2014
Interview with Yuriy Abramochkin in Sakharov Center

1936 births
2018 deaths
Soviet photographers
Photographers from Moscow
Russian photojournalists
Honorary Members of the Russian Academy of Arts
Burials at Vagankovo Cemetery